The 1992-1993 season in Bosnia and Herzegovina was not held due to Bosnian war.

The Bosnian Serbs team FK Borac Banja Luka played in First League of FR Yugoslavia and based in FR Yugoslavia.

Football transfer

References